Bazenville is a commune in the Calvados department in the Normandy region of north-western France.

Bazenville Airfield was a former World War II Advanced Landing Ground, mostly located outside the commune of Bazenville 1.8 km to the north-east.

The inhabitants of the commune are known as Bazenvillais or Bazenvillaises.

Geography
Bazenville is located some 6 km east by north-east of Bayeux and 4 km south by south-east of Arromanches-les-Bains. Access to the commune is by the D87 road from Ryes in the north-west which passes through the commune south of the village and continues south-east to Villiers-le-Sec. The D112 from Sommervieu to Crépon forms the north-western border of the commune. Apart from the village there is the hamlet of Les Noyaux. There is a British Military Cemetery in the west of the commune on the D87. The commune is entirely farmland.

Toponymy

Bazonille is mentioned as Basonni villa in 875.

Bazenville appears as Bazanville on the 1750 Cassini Map and as Bazan ville on the 1790 version.

History

Bazenville was liberated on the same day as the Normandy landings on 6 June 1944. An interim Canadian aerodrome (referred to as Bazenville Airfield, Advanced Landing Ground B-2 Bazenville, or B-2 Crépon) was built commencing the following night near the commune in a large part of the triangle formed by the Bazenville, Crépon, and Villiers-le-Sec villages.

It was on this aerodrome that the French ace Pierre Clostermann flew, on 11 June 1944, for the first time in France after his entry into the war in 1942: "All my life I will remember the people of Bazenville the first French to whom I spoke".

Administration

List of Successive Mayors

Demography
In 2017 the commune had 137 inhabitants.

Culture and heritage

Civil heritage
A Commemorative plaque remembering the site of the airfield where Pierre Clostermann arrived on 11 June 1944.

The commune has many buildings and sites that are registered as historical monuments:
A Farmhouse at Rue des Alliés (1759)
A Tradesman's house at Rue des Cordiers (19th century)
The Bazenville Farmhouse at Rue de l'Eglise (17th century)
A House at Rue de l'Eglise (18th century)
A Notable's House at Rue de l'Eglise (18th century)
The Chateau of Bazenville at Rue de la Grotte (17th century)
The Manor of Tournebu at Rue des Noyaux (17th century)
A Worker's House at Route de Villiers-le-Sec (19th century)
The Chateau de la Croix at Route de Villiers-le-Sec (1727)
The British Cemetery of Ryes (20th century). The cemetery contains 979 graves: 630 British, 21 Canadians, one Australian, one Pole, and 326 Germans.
The War Memorial (1929)
The Grotto of Lourdes (1947)
Bazenville Village (Ancient times)
Houses (17th-19th century)

Religious heritage
The commune has several religious buildings and sites that are registered as historical monuments:
A Presbytery at Rue de l'Eglise (19th century)
The Parish Church of Saint-Martin at le Bourg (13th century) The Church contains a large number of objects which are registered as historical objects.

Heritage Picture Gallery

Notable people linked to the commune
 Antoine Halley, born in 1593 at Bazenville died in 1675, poet.

See also
Communes of the Calvados department

References

Communes of Calvados (department)